2015 Tour of Iran (Azerbaijan) was the 30th edition of the Tour of Iran (Azerbaijan) which took place over six stages, between 28 May and 2 June 2015 in Iranian Azerbaijan. The race was won by Iranian rider Samad Pourseyedi.

Schedule

Stages

Stage 1
28 May 2015 — Tabriz to Meshginshahr,

Stage 2
29 May 2015 — Sareyn to Tabriz,

Stage 3
30 May 2015 — Tabriz to Urmia,

Stage 4
31 May 2015 — Urmia to Aras Free Zone,

Stage 5
1 June 2015 — Aras Free Zone to Ayenehlu,

Stage 6
2 June 2015 — Tabriz to Tabriz,

Final standings

General and Asian rider classifications

Points classification

Mountains classification

Teams classification

References

External links
 videos of 2015 Tour of Iran (Azerbaijan)

Tour of Azerbaijan (Iran)
Tour of Iran (Azerbaijan)
Tour of Iran (Azerbaijan)